This name uses Portuguese naming customs. The first or maternal family name is  Apna and the second or paternal family name is Embaló.

Carlos Apna Embaló (born 25 November 1994) is a Guinea-Bissauan footballer who plays as a winger or a forward for Italian  club Cittadella.

Football career
Embalo was bought by Palermo from Portuguese team Chaves. Rosanero then loaned Embalo to Carpi. On 13 September 2014, Embaló made his professional debut with Carpi in a 2014–15 Serie B match against Crotone. After his loan period end, Palermo loaned him to Lecce and Brescia.

On 15 June 2016, Palermo officially announced the contract extension with Embalo until 30 June 2020.

On 25 January 2019, he joined Cosenza on loan until the end of the 2018–19 season.

After Palermo's exclusion from Italian football, he left Italy for Belgium by joining Eupen. On 29 January 2021, he joined Spanish club AD Alcorcón on loan for the remainder of the 2020–21 Segunda División season.

On 23 June 2022, Embaló returned to Italy and signed with Serie B side Cittadella.

International goals
Scores and results list Guinea-Bissau's goal tally first.

References

External links

1994 births
Living people
Sportspeople from Bissau
Bissau-Guinean footballers
Portuguese footballers
Association football midfielders
Segunda Divisão players
Serie A players
Serie B players
Serie C players
Belgian Pro League players
Segunda División players
G.D. Chaves players
A.C. Carpi players
U.S. Lecce players
Brescia Calcio players
Palermo F.C. players
Cosenza Calcio players
K.A.S. Eupen players
AD Alcorcón footballers
A.S. Cittadella players
Bissau-Guinean expatriate sportspeople in Italy
Expatriate footballers in Italy
Bissau-Guinean expatriate sportspeople in Belgium
Bissau-Guinean expatriate sportspeople in Spain
Expatriate footballers in Belgium
Expatriate footballers in Spain
Guinea-Bissau international footballers